Carlotta Ferrari (27 January 183722 November 1907) was an Italian composer noted for opera.

Life
Carlotta Ferrari was born in Lodi, Italy, and studied singing and piano at the Milan Conservatory with Giuseppina Strepponi. Ferrari wrote her first opera Ugo at the age of twenty. Faced with a lack of interest, she raised funds for its first public production in Lecco and conducted the performances herself. In April 1875, Ferrari was made an honorary professor of composition at the Philharmonic Academy of Bologna, upon the recommendation of Ambroise Thomas.   Besides songs and opera, she published an autobiography and poetry and prose works in four volumes titled Versi e prose in Bologna from 1878 to 1882. She died in Bologna.

Works
Ferrari was a successful composer within her lifetime. She composed operas and cantatas and was considered a master of canon. Selected works include:
Requiem Mass
Ugo, opera
Sofia, opera
Eleonora d'Arborea, opera
Non t'accostare all'urna, text by Jacopo Vittorelli

References

Italian women classical composers
Italian opera composers
1837 births
1907 deaths
Women opera composers
Italian classical composers
People from Lodi, Lombardy
Milan Conservatory alumni
19th-century Italian writers
19th-century Italian women writers
19th-century Italian composers
20th-century Italian composers
19th-century classical composers
20th-century classical composers
20th-century women composers
19th-century women composers
20th-century Italian women